Pekka Salminen (born 11 August 1937 in Tampere) is a Finnish Professor of Architecture and founder and a senior partner of PES-Architects, formed in 1968, in Helsinki, Finland. He is also the founder of Unije Workshop International UWI, and the Centre for Architecture and Urban Planning, formed in Unije, Croatia, in 1987.

He received a BSc in architecture from Tampere Institute of Technology in 1960, and an MSc in architecture from Helsinki University of Technology, 1966. At that time he was employed by notable Finnish architect Timo Penttilä and worked on the design of Penttilä's most notable work Helsinki City Theatre, completed in 1967. On Penttilä's death in 2011, Salminen wrote the chief obituary in the Finnish architectural press. Salminen is a member of the Finnish Association of Architects SAFA and the Association of Croatian Architects.

Memberships and honors
 Professor, honorary title granted by the President of Finland, 1998
 President of Finnish Association of Architects (SAFA), 1986–1987
 President of Association of Finnish Architects' Offices (ATL), 1998–1999
 Member of Finnish Academy of Sciences, 2002–
 Finnish State Prize for the Arts, 2002
 The Order of the Croatian Star, Medal for Merits in Culture, 2003
 Member of Finnish Association of Architects (SAFA), 1966–
 Member of Croatian Association of Architects (UHA), 1996–
 Member of Berlin Chamber of Architects, Germany, 1997–
 Honorary member of OISTAT Finland (International Organization of Scenographers and Theatre Architects), 2009–
 Founder and Senior Partner of PES-Architects (1968–), Helsinki, Finland.
 PES-Architects Consulting (Shanghai) Co. Ltd, China, established in 2011
 Founder of Unije Workshop International UWI, Centre for Architecture and Urban Planning, Unije, Croatia, 1987–
 In China, over 50 architecture competitions, 10 first prizes, 2003–2012

Major awards 
 Finnish Concrete Prize 1977, 1982, 1994, 2001; honorary mention 1990
 Finnish Steel Prize 1999, honorary mention 2001
 State Prize Mecklenburg-Vorpommern 2002, Germany
 European Union Prize for Contemporary Architecture Mies van der Rohe Award, 2003 nominee, 2003
 German Architecture Prize, 2003
 German Concrete Architecture Prize, 2003
 City of Wuxi Architecture Award 2012, China

Main works 
 Lahti Sports Centre and Lahti Ski Museum, Finland 1977, 1999
 Lahti City Theatre, Finland, 1983
 Police College of Finland, Tampere 1992-1999
 Helsinki-Vantaa Airport, Terminal T2, 1996–99; Terminal T3, 2001–2004
 Concert Hall St. Mary's Church, Neubrandenburg, Germany 1996–2001
 Wuxi Grand Theatre, Wuxi, China 2008–2012
 Own office and atelier, Helsinki, Finland 1976–2012
 Strait Culture Art Center, Fuzhou, China 2015-2018

References

External links
 

1937 births
Living people
People from Tampere
Finnish architects